Speocera jacquemarti is a species of spider of the family Ochyroceratidae. It is endemic to the Galápagos Islands.

See also
 List of Ochyroceratidae species

References

Ochyroceratidae
Endemic fauna of the Galápagos Islands
Spiders of South America
Spiders described in 1986